Christofer Rutger Ludvig Manderström (22 January 1806 – 18 August 1873) was the Swedish - Norwegian  Prime Minister of Foreign Affairs between 1858-1868.

He was elected a member of the Royal Swedish Academy of Sciences in 1848, and of the Swedish Academy (seat number 15) in 1852.

References

1806 births
1873 deaths
Swedish Ministers for Foreign Affairs
Members of the Royal Swedish Academy of Sciences
Members of the Swedish Academy
19th-century Swedish politicians
Ambassadors of Sweden to Austria
Ambassadors of Sweden to France
Knights of the Order of Charles XIII
19th-century Swedish nobility
19th-century Swedish diplomats